{|
{{Infobox ship image
|Ship image=Suffren-IMG 8647.jpg
|Ship caption=1/20th scale model of Suffren, lead ship of Bayards class, on display at the Musée national de la Marine
}}

|}

The Bayard''' was a 90-gun Ship of the line of the French Navy. She was the first ship in French service named in honour of Pierre Terrail, seigneur de Bayard.

 Career Bayard took part in the Crimean War in the Black Sea in 1854 and 1855, notably taking part in the Siege of Sevastopol by shelling the city on 17 October 1854. She suffered serious damage in the storm of 14 November, and returned to France to be place in ordinary.

In 1858, she was transformed into a steam and sail ship in Cherbourg, carrying out her first engine trials in 1860. The next year, she again suffered severe damage in a storm in the Strait of Magellan.

In 1866, she was used as a troopship to return the expeditionary corps back to France after the French intervention in Mexico. From 1871, she was used as a prison hulk in Cherbourg for prisoners from the Paris Commune. Struck on 20 June 1872, she was renamed Triton'' and eventually broken up in 1879.

Notes, citations, and references

Notes

Citations

References

External links
 90-guns ships-of-the-line

Ships of the line of the French Navy
Ships built in France
1847 ships
Crimean War naval ships of France
Suffren-class ships of the line